Agelanthus validus is a species of hemiparasitic plant in the family Loranthaceae, which is found in the Usambara Mountains, Tanzania

Description 
A description of the plant is given in Govaerts et al., based on  Polhill & Wiens (1999).

Habitat/ecology
A. validus parasitises Catha, Maytenus and Scolopia.

Threats 
The major threat is habitat conversion for timber and agriculture. Both the quality and extent of its habitat are  declining.

References

Flora of Tanzania
validus